Uma Nehru (8 March 1884 – 28 August 1963) was an Indian independence activist and politician.

Career 

In the early 20th century, she was a frequent writer in Stree Darpan, a woman's monthly magazine founded in 1909 by Rameshwari Nehru, in which she expressed feminist views.

She took part in the Salt March and the Quit India Movement and was subsequently imprisoned. After the independence, she was twice elected to the Lok Sabha from Sitapur in Uttar Pradesh. From 1962 until her death, she was a member of the Rajya Sabha.

Personal life 
Born in Agra, Nehru was educated at Saint Mary's Convent, Hubli. In 1901, she married Jawaharlal Nehru's cousin Shamlal. The couple had a daughter, Shyam Kumari, and a son, Anand Kumar. Anand Kumar Nehru's son Arun Nehru was a Union Minister in Rajiv Gandhi's government in the 1980s. Uma Nehru died on 28 August 1963 in Lucknow.

References

Bibliography 
 «View of I primi passi del femminismo indiano: Rameshwari e Uma Nehru nell’India di inizio Novecento | Storia delle Donne», 10 luglio 2020. https://oaj.fupress.net/index.php/sdd/article/view/2520/2520.

1884 births
1963 deaths
Indian independence activists from Uttar Pradesh
Prisoners and detainees of British India
Lok Sabha members from Uttar Pradesh
Rajya Sabha members from Uttar Pradesh
Women in Uttar Pradesh politics
India MPs 1952–1957
India MPs 1957–1962
Nehru–Gandhi family
Indian National Congress politicians from Uttar Pradesh
20th-century Indian women politicians
20th-century Indian politicians
Women Indian independence activists
People from Agra
People from Sitapur district
Women members of the Lok Sabha
Women members of the Rajya Sabha